The Journal of Religion and Theatre  was a peer-reviewed academic journal covering research on the relationship between theatre and religion. It was abstracted and indexed in the MLA International Bibliography. It was established in 2001 with Debra Bruch as founding editor-in-chief until 2006. She was succeeded by Heather Beasley until the journal was discontinued in 2010. It was published by the Religion and Theatre Focus Group of the Association for Theatre in Higher Education.

External links 

Annual journals
Arts journals
English-language journals
Open access journals
Publications established in 2002
Publications disestablished in 2010
Theatre studies